Henry Sturgis Drinker (8 November 1850 – 27 July 1937) was an American mechanical engineer, lawyer, author, and the fifth president of Lehigh University.

Biography
Drinker was born in Hong Kong, the third child of expatriate Philadelphia Quaker merchant Sandwith B. Drinker (1808–1858) and Susannah Budd Shober (1813–1860). Sandwith made his first trading voyage to China about 1845, and was joined there about 1849, by his wife and two children, Catherine (1841–1922) and Robert (1842–1890). Their fourth child, Elizabeth (1855–1919), was born in Macau. Sandwith died at Macau in January 1858, and Susannah and the children returned to the United States. They settled in Baltimore, where she opened Mrs. Drinker's Academy for Young Ladies. Susannah developed uterine cancer and died two years later, leaving the children orphans.

Henry Sturgis Drinker graduated from Lehigh University with a degree in mechanical engineering in 1871. Hired by the Lehigh Valley Railroad, the following year he was put in charge of construction of a two-mile tunnel through New Jersey's Musconetcong Mountains. The tunnel was completed in 1875, and enabled the Easton and Amboy Railroad (a LVRR subsidiary) to bypass canals and deliver Pennsylvania coal directly to its terminal at Perth Amboy, New Jersey, on New York Harbor.

Drinker published books and articles on drilling, blasting, and buttressing tunnels. He became an expert on legal matters related to railroad construction, and edited a revised edition of Ball's General Railroad and Telegraph Laws of Pennsylvania (1884). He completed a law degree, and served as general solicitor for the Lehigh Valley Railroad from 1885 to 1905.

Lehigh University
Coal baron and former LVRR president Asa Packer founded Lehigh University as a tuition-free engineering school for young men. Drinker left the LVRR in 1905, to become the university's fifth president, the first alumnus to hold the position.

Lehigh then consisted of the College of Engineering and the College of Liberal Arts, and could no longer afford to be tuition-free. Students were responsible for finding their own housing and meals off campus. Drinker sought to improve the student experience—the first dormitories and student dining hall were built on campus, the athletic facilities were expanded, and the first fraternity buildings were erected on university land. He established the College of Business in 1910 (endowed by steelmaker John Fritz), and organized the Alumni Association, which published an alumni bulletin and created a university endowment separate from the Packer bequest.During Pres. Drinker's administration Lehigh University has had a marked expansion in its plant, including the erection of two dormitories, a college dining hall, a student club house, a mining engineering laboratory, a testing engineering laboratory, a new gymnasium and field house, and a complete renovation of the athletic field, including the erection of a concrete stadium.Drinker also served as president of the American Forestry Association. He created the university's forestry department, and beautified the campus with rare trees and plants. Anticipating the U.S.'s entry into World War I, he established an early form of Army ROTC.

Drinker retired from the university in 1920, at age 69.

Personal
 
Drinker married Aimee Ernesta “Etta” Beaux on December 2, 1879. Etta (1852–1939) also had suffered significant childhood loss. When she was 3, her mother died within days of giving birth to her sister, Cecilia. Unable to cope, their French father left the girls in Philadelphia with his wife's widowed mother, Mrs. John Wheeler Leavitt, and returned to France. He made visits to the United States, but never had a close relationship with either daughter. Cecilia displayed artistic talent as a teen, and took private lessons with the art teacher at her finishing school; Catherine Drinker (Henry's older sister).

Henry and Etta Drinker had six children:
Henry "Harry" Sandwith Drinker (1880–1965), lawyer, musician and composer
James Blathwaite Drinker (1882–1971), banker, executive with J.B. Drinker & Co.
Cecil Kent Drinker M.D. (1887–1956), physician and professor, founder of the Harvard School of Public Health
Aimee Ernesta Drinker Bullitt Beaux Barlow (1892–1981), interior decorator and writer, radio announcer as "Commando Mary"
Philip Drinker (1894–1972), chemical engineer and industrial hygienist, co-inventor of the iron lung
Catherine Drinker Bowen (1897–1973), historian and biographer, winner of the 1958 National Book Award for Nonfiction

Cecilia Beaux attended the Pennsylvania Academy of the Fine Arts. Her first major success, Les Derniers Jours d'Enfance (The Last Days of Infancy) (1884), was a portrait of Etta holding a 3-year-old Harry. It was exhibited at PAFA, where it won the 1885 Mary Smith Prize, and at the 1887 Paris Salon. Beaux became a noted artist, and painted numerous portraits of Drinker family members.

For the first year of their marriage, Henry and Etta Drinker lived with her grandmother Leavitt (and sister Cecilia) in a West Philadelphia house at 4305 Spruce Street. Their first child, Harry, was born there. Between 1880 and 1893, the couple and their growing family lived at various West Philadelphia addresses, before building a large suburban house on the campus of Haverford College. Sons Harry, James and Cecil all graduated from Haverford. Drinker accepted the presidency of Lehigh University in 1905, and the family moved to Bethlehem, Pennsylvania. The Drinkers occupied the university's President's House from 1905 to 1920. Son Philip graduated from Lehigh; daughter Catherine married a Lehigh professor.

In retirement, Henry and Etta Drinker lived in a suburban house in Merion Station, just outside Philadelphia. His sister, Catherine, and their son, Philip, were living with them in 1921, while their son Harry and his wife, Sophie, were living nearby.

At age 80, Henry Sturgis Drinker completed an autobiography (1931, unpublished). He died in 1937, at age 86.

See also
List of Lehigh University presidents

References

External links
Online books by Henry Sturgis Drinker, from University of Pennsylvania

1850 births
1937 deaths
People from Philadelphia
American railroad mechanical engineers
Lehigh University alumni
Lehigh Valley Railroad people
People from Lower Merion Township, Pennsylvania
Presidents of Lehigh University
Drinker family